Vilmarie Castellvi (born 21 March 1981) is a former professional tennis player from Puerto Rico.

She received a wildcard to play at the 2005 Sunfeast Open and defeated Emmanuelle Gagliardi in the first round but lost to Karolina Šprem in the second; this was her best WTA Tour performance. She did not qualify for any Grand Slam events.

College
While at Tennessee, Castellvi won the Honda Sports Award as the nation's best female tennis player in 2003.

ITF finals

Singles (2–5)

Doubles (4–1)

References

External links
 
 

Living people
1981 births
Puerto Rican female tennis players
Pan American Games medalists in tennis
People from Guaynabo, Puerto Rico
Pan American Games silver medalists for Puerto Rico
Tennis players at the 2003 Pan American Games
Central American and Caribbean Games gold medalists for Puerto Rico
Central American and Caribbean Games silver medalists for Puerto Rico
Central American and Caribbean Games bronze medalists for Puerto Rico
Central American and Caribbean Games medalists in tennis
Tennis players at the 2007 Pan American Games
Medalists at the 2003 Pan American Games
Tennessee Volunteers women's tennis players